Military Spouse Day or Military Spouse Appreciation Day is celebrated on the Friday before Mother's Day in the United States.  Many United States citizens take this day to acknowledge the significant contributions, support, and sacrifices of spouses of their Armed Forces. Each year, the US President normally commemorates this day with a ceremonial speech and proclamation.

History
President Ronald Reagan recognized the profound importance of spouse commitment to the readiness and well-being of military members and declared May 23, 1984 the first Military Spouse Day with Proclamation 5184, dated April 17, 1984.  The US Secretary of Defense, Caspar Weinberger standardized the date by declaring the Friday preceding Mother's Day as Military Spouse Day. On May 12, 2017, Donald Trump issued a Presidential proclamation for Military Spouse Day.

References

Further reading

For Examples of Military Spouse Sacrifices see,
Elizabeth Van Winkle, "The Impact of Multiple Deployments and Social Support on Stress Levels of Women Married to Active Duty Servicemen," Armed Forces & Society, published online September 4, 2013, DOI: 10.1177/0095327X13500651

External links
 The 2017 Proclamation by the President of the United States
 The 2016 Proclamation by the President of the United States
 The 2015 Proclamation by the President of the United States
 The 2014 Proclamation by the President of the United States
 The 2013 Proclamation by the President of the United States
 The 2012 Proclamation by the President of the United States
 The 2011 Proclamation by the President of the United States
 The 2010 Proclamation by the President of the United States
 Military Spouse Day Information

May observances
Recurring events established in 1984
1984 establishments in the United States